is a baseball manga series written and illustrated by Shinji Mizushima. It tells the story of fictional baseball player . It started to be serialized in 1973 in Shogakukan's seinen manga magazine Big Comic Original, and ended on February 5, 2014, after 976 chapters published in the magazine.

In 1977, it received the Shogakukan Manga Award for seinen/general manga. In 2004, Mizushima auctioned off the right to appear as a character in Abu-san for over ¥3 million, as a fundraiser for Mangajapan. As of 2013, the series has sold over 22 million copies.

The Fukuoka SoftBank Hawks currently honours Squad no.90, which belongs to Yasutake Kageura.

References 

1973 manga
Baseball in anime and manga
Seinen manga
Shogakukan manga
Winners of the Shogakukan Manga Award for general manga